Aleksander Einseln (25 October 1931 – 16 March 2017) was an Estonian general, the Commander of the Estonian Defence Forces from 1993 to 1995 and previously a United States Army colonel. Born in Estonia, his mother and he – barely in his teens – fled from the Red Army that was returning to occupy Estonia. From 1950 to 1985, he served in the US Army, taking part in the Korean War, and as a Special Forces A-team commander in the Vietnam War. In 1993, at the request of President Lennart Meri, he returned to Estonia to serve as the first Commander of the Estonian Defence Forces following the restoration of Estonia's independence.

Biography
Aleksander Einseln was born in Estonia on 25 October 1931. Einseln's father was deported by the Soviet occupants. His mother and he sought refuge in the West in 1944, becoming displaced persons in postwar Germany. In 1949 they emigrated to United States.

Just before the outbreak of the Korean War in 1950, Einseln enlisted in the United States Army, and served as a paratrooper. In 1955, he was commissioned as a lieutenant, and in 1964 completed the US Army Special Forces officer qualification course. He served with Special Forces in Vietnam during 1965–1966. In 1968, he graduated from George Washington University, and the next year from the Army Staff College. Einseln served another tour in Vietnam in 1971–1972. During 1975–1976 he served in staff training positions at Army headquarters. After graduating from the National Defense College senior course, Einseln served from 1977 to 1982 as head of the European and North Atlantic Treaty Organization office in the Planning and Policy Division of the Joint Chiefs of Staff. After that, he held post of Deputy Inspector General in the United States Pacific Command until his retirement in 1985. During his career in the US Army, Einseln commanded infantry, paratroop, Special Forces and training units, earning 28 medals and retiring as a colonel.

In 1993, at the request of Estonian President Lennart Meri, Einseln returned to Estonia to take command of its military forces, over the objections of the U.S. State Department. The U.S. threatened to terminate Einseln's military pension and even to revoke his U.S. citizenship. However, after getting support from several U.S. senators, Einseln received official permission from the U.S. authorities to take on his new post.

In January 1995, after the start of the First Chechen War, Einseln issued an order stating that in the event of foreign troops crossing the border, Estonian Defence Forces were to immediately initiate active resistance, and not cease fighting until ordered to do so by the President of Estonia. This was intended as a mechanism to prevent surrender without resistance as had happened in 1939. In 2014, after the beginning of the conflict in Ukraine, active Commander-in-Chief General Riho Terras noted that Einseln's decree is still in force.

Earlier, on 4 December 1995, General Einseln handed in his resignation as Commander of the Armed Forces due to a disagreement with the Minister of Defense.

In February 1996, he was awarded the Estonian Order of the Cross of the Eagle.

Einseln died on 16 March 2017, aged 85. His ashes were buried on 2 April 2018 at Arlington National Cemetery alongside other veterans of the Korean and Vietnam Wars.

Effective dates of promotion

Estonian Army
See Military ranks of Estonia

Awards, decorations, and recognition

Awards and decorations

Notes

External links
 http://www.people.com/people/archive/article/0,,20105981,00.html

1931 births
2017 deaths
People from Tallinn
Estonian generals
Estonian emigrants to the United States
United States Army colonels
United States Army personnel of the Korean War
United States Army personnel of the Vietnam War
Recipients of the Military Order of the Cross of the Eagle, Class II
Estonian World War II refugees
Child refugees
20th-century Estonian military personnel
Burials at Arlington National Cemetery